Marmorofusus verbinneni is a species of sea snail, a marine gastropod mollusc in the family Fasciolariidae, the spindle snails, the tulip snails and their allies.

Description

Distribution
This marine species occurs in the northern Red Sea; Gulf of Aqaba and Egyptian coast from near Hurghada southward to Al Quşayr, 2–20 m.

References

 Snyder M.A. 2006. A new species of Fusinus (Gastropoda: Fasciolariidae) from the Red Sea and the identity of Fusinus undulatus (Gmelin, 1791). Gloria Maris 45(5): 104-114

External links
 Lyons W.G. & Snyder M.A. (2019). Reassignments to the genus Marmorofusus Snyder & Lyons, 2014 (Neogastropoda: Fasciolariidae: Fusininae) of species from the Red Sea, Indian Ocean, and southwestern Australia. Zootaxa. 4714(1): 1-64

verbinneni
Gastropods described in 2006